Punjabi Chandu Halwai Karachiwala is a halwai shop in Mumbai. It was originally established in Karachi in 1896 by Chandulal Bahl, a Punjabi Khatri.

Its owners moved to Mumbai after the partition of India. Karachi halwa, also known as Bombay halwa was popularized by halwais moving from Karachi.

While many preparations remain traditional, it occasionally develop new sweets.

Feeding of refugees
Sri Prakasa, the first High Commissioner to Pakistan, recalled an incident during the days of partition, when he faced the problem of feeding the refugees in Karachi in 1947. He was able to get the food supplies from Chandu Halwai, which refused to take the payment.

See also
 Kesar Da Dhaba
 Ghantewala
 Badkul
 K.C. Das Grandsons

References

External links 
 Chandu Halwai web-site

Culture of Mumbai
Restaurants in Mumbai
Confectionery companies of India
Cuisine of Karachi
Restaurants established in 1896
Indian companies established in 1896
1896 establishments in British India
Karachi

pl:Chandni Chowk